Pres. Gral. Óscar D. Gestido International Airport , formerly called Cerro Chapeu International Airport, is an airport serving Rivera, the capital of Rivera Department in Uruguay, and also serving Santana do Livramento, Brazil. There are plans to formally upgrade the facility to a binational facility, serving borth Uruguay and Brazil. 

The airport was opened on June 16, 1979, and is named after Óscar Diego Gestido (1901-1967), President of Uruguay in 1967.

There are low wooded hills north and east of the runway. The Rivera non-directional beacon (Ident: RV) is located on the field.

Airlines and destinations
No scheduled flights operate at this airport.

Access

See also

Transport in Uruguay
List of airports in Uruguay

References

External links
OpenStreetMap - Rivera International Airport
OurAirports - Presidente General Don Oscar D. Gestido International Airport

Airports in Uruguay
Airports established in 1979
Buildings and structures in Rivera Department
Rivera